Scotland is one of only six countries to have competed in every Commonwealth Games since the first Empire Games in 1930. The others are Australia, Canada, England, New Zealand and Wales. 

The Commonwealth Games is the only major multi-sport event in which Scottish athletes and teams compete as Scotland; otherwise Scotland participates in multi-sport events as part of a Great Britain team.

Scotland has hosted the Commonwealth Games three times, Edinburgh in 1970 and 1986, and Glasgow in 2014. The inaugural Commonwealth Youth Games were held in Edinburgh in 2000.

Scotland sent a team of 207 athletes and 85 officials to the 2002 Commonwealth Games in Manchester, England, and won 30 medals (6 Gold, 8 Silver and 16 Bronze).  

After the 2018 Commonwealth Games in Gold Coast, Queensland, Australia, Scotland was seventh in the all-time tally of medals, with an overall total of 451 medals (119 Gold, 132 Silver and 200 Bronze). 

Scotland's most successful Commonwealth medallist by total medals is swimmer Duncan Scott, with 3 Gold, 2 Silver and 8 Bronze medals from 2014 to 2022. 

In 2018, Lawn Bowler Alex Marshall became the most successful athlete by Golds, winning his fifth Gold Medal which gave him 6 overall, having also won a Silver at the Gold Coast Games. 

Other successful medallists include athlete Allan Wells (a total of 4 Gold, 1 Silver & 1 Bronze in two Games – 1978 & 1982) and Peter Heatly (diving Gold's in three successive Games & 1 Silver & 1 Bronze – 1950, 1954 & 1958).  Lawn bowler Willie Wood is the first competitor to have competed in seven Commonwealth Games, from 1974 to 2002, missing 1986 because of a dispute over amateurism.

Scotland won its 500th overall medal at the 2022 Commonwealth Games in Birmingham, England after runner Eilish McColgan won silver in the Women's 5,000m. These games were also the best performing for Scotland outwith Glasgow 2014.

Medal tally

Commonwealth Games council and member governing bodies
The Commonwealth Games Council for Scotland (CGCS) is the national sporting organisation responsible for entering a Scottish team in the Commonwealth Games and the Commonwealth Youth Games. It is also responsible for organising bids for hosting the Commonwealth Games. The CGCS headquarters is at the Gannochy Sports Centre, on the campus of the University of Stirling.

Membership of the CGCS consists of representatives of the governing bodies of the 26 sports in the Commonwealth Games programme from which the host city selects up to 17 sports for each Commonwealth Games:
Aquatics: Scottish Swimming
Archery: Scottish Archery Association
Athletics: Scottish Athletics
Badminton: Badminton Scotland
Basketball: Basketball Scotland
Beach volleyball: Scottish Volleyball
Boxing: Amateur Boxing Scotland
Canoeing: Scottish Canoe Association
Cricket: Cricket Scotland
Cycling: Scottish Cycling
Fencing: Scottish fencing
Field hockey: Scottish Hockey Union
Gymnastics: Scottish Gymnastics
Judo: Judo Scotland
Lawn bowling (men's): Scottish Bowling Association
Lawn bowling (women's): Scottish Women's Bowling Association
Netball: Netball Scotland
Rowing: Scottish Amateur Rowing Association
Rugby union: Scottish Rugby Union
Shooting: Scottish Target Shooting Federation
Squash: Scottish Squash
Tennis: Tennis Scotland
Table Tennis: Table Tennis Scotland
Tenpin bowling: Scottish Tenpin Bowling Association
Triathlon: Scottish Triathlon Association
Weightlifting: Scottish Amateur Weightlifters Association
Wrestling: Scottish Wrestling Association
Disabled sport: Scottish disability sport

Flag and victory anthem 
 
Scotland uses the St Andrew's Cross as its flag at the Commonwealth Games. This flag is common for all sporting teams that represent Scotland as an entity distinct from the United Kingdom.

From 2010 onwards, Scotland will use "Flower of Scotland" as the victory anthem. This replaces "Scotland the Brave" which was used at previous between 1958 and 2006. Prior to 1958, "Scots Wha Hae" was used. The new anthem was chosen in January 2010 by athletes that had been selected to participate in the 2010 games. The shortlist of anthems also included "Scotland the Brave", "Loch Lomond" and "Highland Cathedral".

See also
2014 Commonwealth Games
Glasgow bid for the 2014 Commonwealth Games
Scotland at the 2010 Commonwealth Games
Scotland at the 2006 Commonwealth Games
Scotland at the 2002 Commonwealth Games
Scotland at the 1998 Commonwealth Games
All-time medal tally of Commonwealth Games
Sport in Scotland

References

External links
 
 Glasgow 2014
 Scottish Masters Swimming
 Scottish Amateur Boxing
 BBC Sport, Swimming Contacts:Scotland

 
Sport in Stirling (council area)
University of Stirling
1930 establishments in Scotland
Nations at the Commonwealth Games